Qarahacılı (also, Karagadzhili and Karagadzhyly) is a village in the Balakan Rayon of Azerbaijan.  The village forms part of the municipality of Kortala.

References 

Populated places in Balakan District